An Inventory of Losses is a book by Judith Schalansky originally published in Germany in 2018 by Suhrkamp Verlag. It placed fourth in Stiftung Buchkunst's "The Most Beautiful German Books" competition (German: Die schönsten deutschen Bücher) in 2019. Its English translation by Jackie Smith was published in 2020 by New Directions and MacLehose Press and awarded with the German Helen and Kurt Wolff Translator's Prize, the Warwick Prize for Women in Translation and the TA First Translation Prize. It was also longlisted for the 2021 International Booker Prize and 2021 National Book Award for Translated Literature.

The chapters are oriented around twelve of the world's losses, each using a different writing style and having what sometimes might seem only a tangential relation to its title.

Chapters 
 Tuanaki
 Caspian Tiger
 Guericke's Unicorn
 Villa Sacchetti
 The Boy in Blue
 The Love Songs of Sappho
 The Von Behr Palace
 The Seven Books of Mani
 Greifswald Harbour
 Encyclopedia in the Wood
 Palace of the Republic
 Kinau's Selenographs

References

2018 books
German non-fiction books
Suhrkamp Verlag books
Translations into English